Crematogaster butteli is a species of ant in tribe Crematogastrini. It was described by Forel in 1913.

References

butteli
Insects described in 1913